The 1931 San Francisco Grey Fog football team was an American football team that represented the University of San Francisco as an independent during the 1931 college football season. In their eighth and final season under head coach Jimmy Needles, the Grey Fog compiled a 4–4–2 record and outscored opponents by a combined total of 155 to 87.

Schedule

References

San Francisco
San Francisco Dons football seasons
San Francisco Grey Fog football